Fahd El Khoumisti (born 1 June 1993) is a French professional footballer who plays as a forward for  club Concarneau.

Club career
Born in Mamers to parents from the city of Taza in Morocco, El Khoumsiti played for various teams in the lower divisions of France to start his career. He joined the Paris Saint-Germain B team in 2017, and had a successful season, finishing as the top scorer on the team with 12 goals.

On 6 June 2018, El Khoumisti transferred to Orléans. He made his professional debut with Orléans in a 2–0 Ligue 2 loss to Lens on 27 July 2018. In October 2019, he was loaned to Le Puy for the remainder of the 2019–20 season.

In January 2021, El Khoumisti signed for Concarneau.

On 27 June 2022, El Khoumisti moved to Le Mans. On 30 November 2022 however, El Khoumisti returned to Concarneau.

Personal life
Born in France, El Khoumisti is of Moroccan descent.

References

External links
 
 

1993 births
Living people
Sportspeople from Sarthe
Association football forwards
French footballers
French sportspeople of Moroccan descent
Sablé FC (France) players
Thouars Foot 79 players
Vendée Fontenay Foot players
US Orléans players
Le Puy Foot 43 Auvergne players
US Concarneau players
Le Mans FC players
Ligue 2 players
Championnat National players
Championnat National 2 players
Championnat National 3 players
Footballers from Pays de la Loire